Golabundan-e Sofla (also Romanized as Golābūndān-e Soflá; also known as Golāvandān-e Soflá) is a village in Qaleh Tall Rural District, in the Central District of Bagh-e Malek County, Khuzestan Province, Iran. At the 2006 census, its population was 169, in 26 families.

References 

Populated places in Bagh-e Malek County